Count  was the 11th and final daimyō of Ōgaki Domain under the Bakumatsu period Tokugawa Shogunate of Japan. He was the 12th hereditary chieftain of the Toda clan. During the Meiji period, he was a diplomat and served as ambassador of Japan to Switzerland and Austria-Hungary.

Biography
Toda Ujitaka was the fifth son of the 9th daimyō of Ōgaki Domain, Toda Ujimasa. He was posthumously adopted to succeed his elder brother, Toda Ujiakira, the 10th daimyō in 1865. The following year he was awarded the courtesy titles of Uneme-no-kami and Lower Fourth court rank.  In 1868, following the defeat of shogunal forces at the Battle of Toba-Fushimi, he was branded an "enemy of the crown"; however, due to an eloquent petition by the domain karō and an apology, he was pardoned and ordered to serve as messenger of the court to other domains along the Tōsandō to urge them to submit to the imperial government. In 1869, with the abolition of the title of daimyō, he became imperial governor of Ōgaki.

In 1870, he enrolled in the new Daigaku Nankō and the following year resigned from all of his posts and set sail from Yokohama for the United States, together with his brother Toda Kindō.After his return to Japan, in October 1879, he was accepted into the Ministry of Education. In 1882, he accompanied Itō Hirobumi on an 18-month trip to Europe to study European constitutional systems to prepare for a constitution for Japan. With the establishment of kazoku peerage on July 8, 1884, he was made a count (hakushaku).

After his return to Japan, Toda became a counselor for the Foreign Ministry. In 1887, he was appointed envoy extraordinary and minister plenipotentiary to Austria-Hungary and Switzerland. He returned to Japan in 1892 to accept a post as official huntsman for the Imperial Household Ministry. He continued with the Imperial Household Ministry in various positions, rising to sea dof the Department of Ceremonies in 1908, holding that position until his retirement in 1928.

On his death in 1936, he was one of the last of the surviving daimyō. His funeral was held according to Shinto rites at the Tokiwa Jinja in Ōgaki. His wife Kiwako was a daughter of Prince Iwakura Tomomi, and died herself less than a month later.

Honors
1885 -  Order of the Rising Sun, 3rd class
1897 -  Order of the Sacred Treasure, 2nd class
1906 -  Order of the Rising Sun, 2nd class
1907 -  Order of the Sacred Treasure, 1st class
1914 -  Order of the Rising Sun, 1st class
1921 -  Order of the Rising Sun with Paulownia Flowers

References

Fudai daimyo
Kazoku
1854 births
1936 deaths
People of the Boshin War
Recipients of the Order of the Rising Sun with Paulownia Flowers
Grand Cordons of the Order of the Rising Sun
Recipients of the Order of the Sacred Treasure, 1st class
Recipients of the Order of the Rising Sun, 2nd class
Recipients of the Order of the Sacred Treasure, 2nd class
Japanese expatriates in the United States
Japanese diplomats